The 2011 Australian Royal Visit Honours for Australia were announced on 18 November 2011.

Royal Victorian Order

Commander of the Royal Victorian Order (CVO)
 Stephen Brady, Secretary to the Governor General.
 Her Excellency Quentin Bryce, 
 His Excellency Malcolm McCusker, 
 Kevin Leslie Skipworth,

Lieutenant of the Royal Victorian Order (LVO)
 Terry Crane

Member of the Royal Victorian Order (MVO)
 Peta Louise Arbuckle
 Rebecca Louise Christie
 Commander Andrew Scott Willis,

References

External links

2011 awards in Australia
Orders, decorations, and medals of Australia